Daniel Ward (born 9 July 1977) is a former Australian Rules footballer for the Melbourne Demons.

Ward was a defender and was named as the club's 'Most Improved Player' after the 1999 season. Two years later he was fifth in Melbourne's best and fairest. He is a former Fitzroy Football Club reserves player.

Ward was a 'run and carry' type player, known for his dashing runs and rebounding attacks from defence. His style of play was not flashy, but very determined and team centred. Despite Melbourne losing the 2000 Grand Final to Essendon, Ward was amongst Melbourne's best performed players that day.

External links

Daniel Ward Profile
Demon Wiki profile

1977 births
Living people
Melbourne Football Club players
Australian rules footballers from Victoria (Australia)
Sandringham Football Club players